The Oceania Handball Challenge Trophy is a handball competition for Under 20 year old men and Under 19 year old women organised by the Oceania Continent Handball Federation. The winner of this competition qualifies for the Men's and Women's Junior World Handball Championship's.

Champions

Men's competition

Participating nations

Women's competition

Participating nations

References

 Men's 1998
 Men's 2010
 Men's 2010 report on NSWHF webpage
 Results on Oceania Continent Handball Federation web page. Retrieved 4 November, 2014.
 Reports on Oceania Continent Handball Federation web page. Retrieved 4 November, 2014.
 2010 Oceania Handball webpage
 Introduction on the International Handball Federation webpage. 3 December 2010
 Report on the International Handball Federation webpage. 17 December 2010
 Men's results 2012
 2012 report on NSWHF webpage
 Women's 1997
 Women's 2012
 2014 Introduction
 2014 Schedule
 2014 matches on YouTube

External links
 Oceania Continent Handball Federation web page
 Oceania on the International Handball Federation web page

 
Handball competitions in Oceania